Nadanje Selo is a settlement south of Šmihel in the Municipality of Pivka in the Inner Carniola region of Slovenia.

History
In 1994, territory from Nadanje Selo, Mala Pristava, Nova Sušica, and Stara Sušica was combined to create Ribnica as a separate settlement.

References

External links
Nadanje Selo on Geopedia

Populated places in the Municipality of Pivka